Lester Chambers (born April 13, 1940, Mississippi, United States) is an American recording artist, and member and lead singer of the 1960s soul rock group The Chambers Brothers, who had the hit single, "Time Has Come Today".

Career
As a member of the Chambers Brothers, he sang lead on the Chambers Brothers songs "All Strung Out Over You", "People Get Ready", "Uptown", "I Can't Turn You Loose", and "Funky".

As a solo artist he released singles and albums  and teamed up with ex-Electric Flag bassist Harvey Brooks to form the Lester Chambers Harvey Brooks Band. He also added vocals to Bonnie Raitt's 1977 Sweet Forgiveness album.

In March 2011, Lester Chambers was inducted into the West Coast Blues Hall of Fame.

Presently Lester performs with his son Dylan as The New Chambers Brothers as part of the band Moonalice which is led by Roger McNamee.

Personal life and hardship
Chambers has reported that despite the group's success, he did not receive any royalty payments from 1967 to 1994. In a chat session on the Soul Patrol website, he discussed such injustices that many black artists have endured.

In 2002 his wife, Lola Chambers, testified before the California Senate hearings on Label Accounting Practices that "Time Has Come Today" earned the group under $250 in royalties for the European market over 16 years.  She said that Columbia Records told them that "there were no overseas sales to report because The Chambers Brothers records were never licensed to an overseas distributor".  But she later discovered copies on eBay of numerous foreign pressings of their records on Columbia foreign affiliate labels for which they were not compensated.

In 2003, the home of Lola and Lester Chambers was broken into and their record collection, consisting of more than 60 Chambers Brothers albums and over one hundred singles, was stolen.  Lola Chambers had spent 25 years collecting Chambers Brothers records at various venues to leave these for their sons.  Lester Chambers developed a number of medical problems that went untreated because he lacked insurance.  He later became homeless, sleeping in a rehearsal hall in Novato, California, until Yoko Ono paid to rent a home for him and his son Dylan.

In March 2012, Chambers started an Internet campaign that went viral to publicize what he claims to be a lack of equitable royalty payments.  His Facebook posting received more than 2,500 "likes" and more than 2,000 "shares" in the first 15 hours on his "Wall"; it was featured on the front page of Reddit and there were hundreds of tweets about the story.

On July 13, 2013, Chambers was assaulted onstage during a performance at the Russell City Hayward Blues Festival after dedicating a performance of "People Get Ready" to Trayvon Martin, the day the jury found his killer not guilty of a criminal offense. He was reported by his son Dylan to be in "ok" condition later the same evening.

Chambers is a resident of Petaluma, California.

Kickstarter project
On December 10, 2012, Lester Chambers and Alexis Ohanian (Reddit co-founder) teamed up to launch a Kickstarter project together with the intent to make a new album titled Lester's Time Has Come. Chambers also spoke with Reddit users on December 13, 2012, at an AMA (Ask Me Anything) event and to mention the Kickstarter project to those interested.

Summer of Soul
In 2021, Lester Chambers and the Chambers Brothers were included in the Questlove Summer of Soul documentary.

Discography

Singles
 "Ain't Nice To Know"/"Let Your Body Sway" -  Masterpiece 1001 - 1984

Albums
 Do You Believe in Rock and Roll - Explosive Records - 2008
 It's Time - Explosive Records - 2005
 Lesters Besters Vol.1 - 2004
 Lester Chambers - 1999

Lester Chambers & KK Martin
 Blues For Sale - Ranell - 2001

Compilation albums
 Various Artists: Blues Today Volume III'' - BT Productions - 2002

References

External links
 Kickstarter Project Page
 A letter from Lester Chambers
 Former Idols of Rock Now Confront the Blues
 Open letter from Lester Chambers to Courtney Love
 First Amendment Class Action Complaint from Lester Chambers
 Lester Chambers ‘Speaking Freely’ Transcript
Lester Chambers Interview - NAMM Oral History Library (2016)

1940 births
Living people
20th-century African-American male singers
21st-century African-American male singers
American blues harmonica players
American blues singers
American soul singers
Musicians from the San Francisco Bay Area
Singers from California
The Chambers Brothers members
Moonalice members